The Mask of Diijon is a 1946 American black-and-white film noir suspense film released from PRC Studios, directed by Lew Landers and featuring Erich von Stroheim, Jeanne Bates and William Wright.

Plot
Diijon, a tired magician, gives up his act to study the power of the mind.  His wife Victoria, once supportive, now is struggling to pay bills.  She urges her stubborn and older husband to return to the magic field where Diijon was considered one of the greats.  He refuses but does reluctantly agree to do a hypnotism nightclub act at Victoria's urging.  The act goes bad and he's laughed off the stage.  He's convinced this is the handiwork of Victoria's ex-lover Tony Holliday.   Later, Diijon finds that he does indeed have the power to control men's minds and begins to take revenge on the people he felt made him look like a fool.  He hypnotizes his young wife to kill the man.  Unfortunately for Diijon, things go horribly wrong.

The opening of the film features a memorable scene depicting a woman being beheaded, with a guillotine—then revealed to be a magic trick.

Cast
 Erich von Stroheim as Diijon
 Jeanne Bates as Victoria
 William Wright as Tony Holiday
 Denise Vernac as Denise
 Edward Van Sloan as Sheffield
 Hope Landin as Mrs. McGaffey
 Mauritz Hugo as Danton

Reception
TV Guide rated it 1/4 stars and wrote, "Except for von Stroheim, the acting was barely adequate."  Writing in Horror Noir, author Paul Meehan said the film "manages to transcend its humble origins primarily through the star power of von Stroheim".

References

External links
 
 
 
 

1946 films
1940s psychological thriller films
American psychological thriller films
American black-and-white films
Film noir
Producers Releasing Corporation films
Films directed by Lew Landers
Films about magic and magicians
Films about hypnosis
Films scored by Karl Hajos
1940s English-language films
1940s American films